The 1999–2000 Ranji Trophy was the 66th season of the Ranji Trophy. Mumbai defeated Hyderabad by 297 runs in the final. V. V. S. Laxman set new seasonal records of 1415 runs and eight hundreds. Kanwaljit Singh's 62 wickets is the second best for a season, after Bishan Bedi's 64 wickets in 1974-75. During the tournament, Rajeev Nayyar made the longest innings in first-class cricket, batting for 1,015 minutes for Himachal Pradesh against Jammu & Kashmir.

Final

Scorecards and averages
Ranji Trophy 1999-00  at BCCI
Statistical highlights of Ranji Trophy 1999-2000 at ESPN Cricinfo

References

External links

2000 in Indian cricket
Ranji Trophy seasons
Domestic cricket competitions in 1999–2000